Coliseum da Coruña is an indoor arena for concerts and shows used in A Coruña, Galicia, Spain. The venue holds 11,000 people for concerts. It was designed by Japanese architect Arata Isozaki, built in 1990 and open on August 12, 1991. It is also occasionally used for ice skating and bull fighting.

It hosted twice the Copa del Rey de Baloncesto: in 1993 and 2016.

See also
 List of indoor arenas in Spain

References

External links

 Coliseum at A Coruña website
Instituto Municipal Coruña Espectáculos information
INSTITUTO MUNICIPAL CORUÑA ESPECTÁCULOS
Configuration for the 2016 Copa del Rey de Baloncesto

A Coruña
Galician culture
Sports venues in Galicia (Spain)
Indoor arenas in Spain
Bullrings in Spain